Acetophenone is the organic compound with the formula C6H5C(O)CH3. It is the simplest aromatic ketone. This colorless, viscous liquid is a precursor to useful resins and fragrances.

Production
Acetophenone is formed as a byproduct of the cumene process, the industrial route for the synthesis of phenol and acetone. In the Hock rearrangement of isopropylbenzene hydroperoxide, migration of a methyl group rather than the phenyl group gives acetophenone and methanol as a result of an alternate rearrangement of the  intermediate:
C6H5C(CH3)2O2H ->  C6H5C(O)CH3 +  CH3OH 
The cumene process is conducted on such a large scale that even the small amount of acetophenone by-product can be recovered in commercially useful quantities. 

Acetophenone is also generated from ethylbenzene hydroperoxide. Ethylbenzene hydroperoxide is primarily converted to 1-phenylethanol (α-methylbenzyl alcohol) in the process with a small amount of by-product acetophenone. Acetophenone is recovered or hydrogenated to 1-phenylethanol which is then dehydrated to produce styrene.

Uses

Precursor to resins
Commercially significant resins are produced from treatment of acetophenone with formaldehyde and a base. The resulting copolymers are conventionally described with the formula , resulting from aldol condensation. These substances are components of coatings and inks. Modified acetophenone-formaldehyde resins are produced by the hydrogenation of the aforementioned ketone-containing resins. The resulting polyol can be further crosslinked with diisocyanates. The modified resins are found in coatings, inks and adhesives.

Niche uses
Acetophenone is an ingredient in fragrances that resemble almond, cherry, honeysuckle, jasmine, and strawberry. It is used in chewing gum. 
It is also listed as an approved excipient by the U.S. FDA.

Laboratory reagent
In instructional laboratories, acetophenone is converted to styrene in a two-step process that illustrates the reduction of carbonyls using hydride and the dehydration of alcohols:
4 C6H5C(O)CH3{} + \overset{sodium\ borohydride}{NaBH4}{} + 4 H2O -> 4 \overset{1-Phenylethanol}{C6H5CH(OH)CH3}{} + \overset{sodium\ hydroxide}{NaOH}{} + \overset{boric\ acid}{B(OH)3} -> C6H5CH=CH2
A similar two-step process is used industrially, but reduction step is performed by hydrogenation over a copper catalyst.
C6H5C(O)CH3 + H2 -> C6H5CH(OH)CH3

Being prochiral, acetophenone is also a popular test substrate for asymmetric hydrogenation experiments.

Drugs
Acetophenone is used for the synthesis of many pharmaceuticals.

A Mannich reaction with dimethylamine and formaldehyde gives β-dimethylaminopropiophenone. Using diethylamine instead gives the diethylamino analog.

Natural occurrence 
Acetophenone occurs naturally in many foods including apple, cheese, apricot, banana, beef, and cauliflower. It is also a component of castoreum, the exudate from the castor sacs of the mature beaver.

Pharmacology 
In the late 19th and early 20th centuries, acetophenone was used in medicine. It was marketed as a hypnotic and anticonvulsant under brand name Hypnone. The typical dosage was 0.12 to 0.3 milliliters. It was considered to have superior sedative effects to both paraldehyde and chloral hydrate. In humans, acetophenone is metabolized to benzoic acid, carbonic acid, and acetone. Hippuric acid occurs as an indirect metabolite and its quantity in urine may be used to confirm acetophenone exposure, although other substances, like toluene, also induce hippuric acid in urine.

Toxicity 
The  is 815 mg/kg (oral, rats). Acetophenone is currently listed as a Group D carcinogen indicating that there is no evidence at present that it causes cancer in humans.

References 

Ketone solvents
Hazardous air pollutants
Excipients
Aromatic ketones
GABAA receptor positive allosteric modulators
Phenyl compounds